The Ministry of Finance of Cameroon is responsible for the public finance policies of Cameroon.

Ministers of Finance
Arouna N'Joya, 1957-1958
Charles Assalé, 1958-1959
Charles Onana Awana, 1963-1964
Victor Kanga, 1964-1966
Simon Nko'o Etoungou, 1966-1968
Aloys Medjo me Zengue, 1968
Bernard Bidias à Ngon, 1968-1972
Charles Onana Awana, 1972-1975
Marcel Yondo, 1975-1978
Gilbert Ntang, 1978-1983
Etienne Ntsama, 1983-1985
Édouard Koulla, 1985-1986
André Booto à Ngon, 1986-1987
Sadou Hayatou, 1987-1990
Simon Bassilekin, 1990-1991
Justin Ndioro à Yombo, 1991-1992
Antoine Ntsimi, 1992-1994
Justin Ndioro à Yombo, 1994-1996
Édouard Akame Mfoumou, 1996-2001
Michel Meva'a M'Eboutou, 2001-2004
Polycarpe Abah Abah, 2004-2007
Essimi Menye, 2007-2011
Alamine Ousmane Mey, 2011-2018
Louis-Paul Motazé, 2018-
Source:

See also 
 Finance ministry
 Economy of Cameroon
 Politics of Cameroon

References

Cameroon
Government of Cameroon